Berlé is a village in the commune of Winseler, in north-western Luxembourg. In 2001, it had a population of 104.

During World War II, in late January 1945, the village was destroyed by the American army's 203rd Field Artillery Group, specifically the 578 Field Artillery Battalion.

Climate

References

Villages in Luxembourg
Wiltz (canton)